John Cleveland Barnes (June 5, 1903 – August 27, 1972), nicknamed "Fat" and "Tubby", was an American baseball catcher in the Negro leagues. He played from 1921 to 1931 with several clubs, spending parts of three seasons each with the Cleveland Tate Stars and St. Louis Stars.

References

External links
 and Baseball-Reference Black Baseball Stats and Seamheads

Cleveland Tigers (baseball) players
Cleveland Tate Stars players
Cleveland Hornets players
Toledo Tigers players
Detroit Stars players
St. Louis Stars (baseball) players
Cleveland Elites players
Indianapolis ABCs players
Memphis Red Sox players
1903 births
1972 deaths
20th-century African-American sportspeople
Baseball catchers